Henry Kaleialoha Allen is a Hawaiian steel guitarist and singer.

Biography
Allen was born June 11, 1933 in Hilo, Hawaii  In 1941 his family relocated to Honolulu.  Allen graduated from President William McKinley High School in 1952.  He began his professional career working in Hawaiian hotels, joining the musicians union in 1953 and working with Alfred Apaka.  He then moved to Los Angeles in 1956 where he studied jazz.  He moved back to Hawaii at the urging of Apaka, setting up a company entitled Polynesian Promotions in Lahaina on the island of Maui.  In the 1970s he worked for the Kaanapali, Hawaii Hilton, producing music for dining and for evening dancing.  He also produced music for the Royal Lahaina Resor, the Sheraton Maui, and the Westin Maui.  He opened a Planet Hollywood in Maui in 1995.  In 2015 Allen received the Lifetime Achievement Award presented by the Hawai'i Academy of Recording Arts while simultaneously receiving from the Hawaii State Senate a resolution of congratulations.

Career
Allen plays steel guitar and sings.  He has toured internationally, achieving particular popularity in Japan.  He composes and arranges Hawaiian music.  For his production company he produces and directs "Polynesian spectaculars".  He performs on a Fender double Stringmaster.  He performed for various television series, including Barnaby Jones, Hawaiian Eye and Mama's Family, and regularly appeared on the QVC shopping channel.  He has released at least three albums, Blue Hawaii, Magic of Steel Guitar, and Memories of Hawaii.  He has worked with such artists as Alfred Apaka and Martin Denny.

References

1933 births
20th-century American guitarists
21st-century American guitarists
American male guitarists
Living people
Musicians from Hawaii
Steel guitarists
20th-century American male musicians
21st-century American male musicians